International Dance Academy is an educational institution in Copenhagen, Denmark and Los Angeles, California, USA. It was founded in 2008 by Sonny Fredie Pedersen.

The Academy is located in Copenhagen, Denmark in Europe and Los Angeles, California with the headquarters being in Copenhagen and accepts students from all around the world.

References

External links

2008 establishments in Denmark
Dance schools